Bea Ballintijn (born 9 May 1923) is a Norwegian former backstroke swimmer who competed in the 1948 Summer Olympics.

References

1923 births
Living people
Norwegian female backstroke swimmers
Olympic swimmers of Norway
Swimmers at the 1948 Summer Olympics